The 1981 NCAA Division III Field Hockey Championship was the first annual NCAA-sponsored tournament to determine the top Division III women's college field hockey team in the United States.

The semifinals and championship of the inaugural event were played at Westfield State College in Westfield, Massachusetts.

Trenton State (now TCNJ) defeated Franklin & Marshall in the final, 2–0, to win their first national title.

Qualified teams
 Six teams qualified for the inaugural tournament.

Bracket

See also 
NCAA Division I Field Hockey Championship
NCAA Division II Field Hockey Championship

References 

1981
1981 in American women's sports
1981 in women's field hockey
1981 in sports in Massachusetts
Women's sports in Massachusetts